Ma Lin (born February 19, 1980) is a retired Chinese table tennis player. 

He learned to play table tennis at the age of five and became a member of the provincial team in 1990. In 1994, he joined the Chinese national team. Ma Lin is the only male player ever to win Olympic gold in Singles, Doubles and Team. Additionally, he previously held a professional era record of 5 major titles (4 World Cups and 1 Olympic Gold), having won more World Cups than any other male table tennis player in history.
(Note: as of 2020, Ma Lin is now tied with Fan Zhendong for the most World Cup wins of all male players with 4 World Cups each.) He has since been surpassed by Ma Long, who has won 7 major titles.

Since retiring in December 2013, Ma Lin has been serving as the head coach of the Guangdong provincial table tennis team.

Style and equipment 
Ma Lin uses the penhold grip. An aggressive player, he is known for his converse unpredictable serves, heavy short push receives, fast footwork, and powerful third ball attacks. In addition to possessing a solid backhand block, Ma Lin also uses the reverse penhold backhand (RPB), an innovative stroke utilizing the underside of the blade which allows a penholder to produce topspin from both wings. The most dangerous weapon Ma Lin has in his arsenal, however, is his consistent forehand loop, which he often uses to end a point decisively. He is also considered a master at serving and his serve is considered one of the best in the world, earning the nickname "Ghost Service". It involves the ball bouncing back to the net instead of going straight off the table.

Because of this, Ma Lin has claimed the titles "Maestro Ma Lin," "Defense Killer," and "Table Tennis Olympic Champion."

Ma Lin is currently using a Yasaka Ma Lin Extra Offensive Penhold as his blade. He uses DHS NEO Skyline 2 TG2 for his forehand and Butterfly Bryce Speed FX for his backhand.

Career 

In the China Table Tennis Super League, Ma Lin played for Bayi Gongshang, Shandong Luneng, Guangdong Gotone, Shaanxi Yinhe and Ningbo Haitan. His transfer to Shaanxi Yinhe for over 5 million Chinese yuan was a league record. His next transfer was to Ningbo Haitan for just 1.3 million yuan (US$168,000), including 1 million yuan in salary.

In China, Ma is famous for his dedication to training ("拼命三郎"); in his early days, he was known for wearing down the soles of his shoes in just three hours. He has won four World Cup trophies (2000, 2003, 2004, 2006), more than any other player in history, but has lost three times in the World Championship finals (1999, 2005, 2007).

Ma Lin has been criticized often for his lack of mental resolve, crumbling in crucial moments. Despite his victories in 1999, he performed poorly in the national trials and was denied a berth in the 2000 Sydney Olympics. He was seeded first in World Championship at Zagreb (2007); however, he lost in the final to his compatriot Wang Liqin, after leading 3–1 in games, and being 7–1 up in the fifth. At a post-match press conference, he revealed that his maternal grandfather had committed suicide before the tournament began.

In the 2008 Beijing Olympics, Ma Lin won the teams competition with his compatriots Wang Liqin and Wang Hao. In the men's singles, Ma Lin defeated Korean player Oh Sang Eun in the quarterfinals (4–0), his rival Wang Liqin in the semifinals (4–2), and world number 1 Wang Hao in the finals (4–1). Ma Lin is now 15–10 head-to-head against Wang Hao.

An anomaly to Ma Lin is that he is one of the few Chinese players who is not able to complete a grand slam, because he has no World Championships title (his closest being 2007). Yet Ma Lin is considered to be the true Olympiad of table tennis, because he has grabbed all possible titles in the Olympics (Athens 2004 – Doubles Champion with Chen Qi, Beijing 2008 – Singles Champion, Team Events Champion). Furthermore, Ma Lin was inducted into the ITTF Hall of Fame in 2010.

Coaching career 
After retirement, Ma Lin has been a coach for the Chinese national team. Since 2013, he has coached the Guangdong provincial team.

Personal life 
Ma Lin's alleged girlfriend, Bai Yang, was dropped from Women's National Team in 2004.  It is against the rules to date in the Chinese National Team for athletes under twenty years old.  Ma Lin went on to secretly marry actress Zhang Yi in late 2004.  They divorced in 2009.  On this Ma Lin stated, "Table tennis would be my wife forever.  This will never change."  Ma Lin married Zhang Yaqing in December 2013.  On April 19, 2016, they had a son.

Titles 
 1999 Men's World Championship 2nd Place
 2000 Men's World Cup champion
 2002 ITTF Pro Tour Grand Finals Men's Singles Gold
 2003 Men's World Cup champion
 2004 Athens Olympic Games champion doubles (with Chen Qi)
 2004 Men's World Cup champion
 2005 Men's World Championship 2nd place
 2006 Men's World Cup champion
 2007 Men's World Championship 2nd place
 2007 ITTF Pro Tour Grand Finals Men's Singles Gold
 2008 Beijing Olympic Games Men's Singles champion and Men's Team champion.
 2009 Men's World Championship 3rd place
 2010 Men's Team World Championship, gold medal.

See also 
 List of table tennis players

References

External links

 Chinese Olympic Committee profile
 Sohu Profile
 
 
 
 Ma Lin Game records
 Ma Lin at Table Tennis Media

1980 births
Living people
Chinese male table tennis players
Table tennis players from Shenyang
Olympic medalists in table tennis
Olympic table tennis players of China
Table tennis players at the 2004 Summer Olympics
Table tennis players at the 2008 Summer Olympics
Olympic gold medalists for China
Medalists at the 2004 Summer Olympics
Medalists at the 2008 Summer Olympics
World Table Tennis Championships medalists
Table tennis players at the 2002 Asian Games
Table tennis players at the 2006 Asian Games
Table tennis players at the 2010 Asian Games
Asian Games medalists in table tennis
Asian Games gold medalists for China
Asian Games silver medalists for China
Asian Games bronze medalists for China
Medalists at the 2002 Asian Games
Medalists at the 2006 Asian Games
Medalists at the 2010 Asian Games